Liyuan Town is an urban town and the seat of Sangzhi County in Hunan, China.

Administrative division
The town is divided into 17 villages and 14 communities, including the following areas:

References

External links

Divisions of Sangzhi County
County seats in Hunan